Djeffal Fayçal is a professor of Engineering Technology & Applied Sciences at the University of Batna. He is a Member of Arab-German Academy of Sciences and Humanities, a member of IEEE, a fellow of African Academy of Sciences and a beneficiary of Microsoft - TWAS - AAS Award.

Education 
He was born in Batna, Algeria in 1975. He obtained his B. Sc, M. SC and PhD  in Electronics from University of Batna in 1998, 2001 and 2006 respectively.

Scientific contributions 
He is known for his contributions in the development of a new way to study nanoscale electronic devices and circuits. His research group is credited with the development of a series of novel soft-computing-based approaches (neural networks, genetic algorithms, particle-swarm computations, neural-space mapping, fuzzy logic, and experts systems) for the modeling of nanoscale electronics devices.

Academic career 

He joined University of Batna in 2003 where he became assistant professor in 2007. In 2012 he became an associate professor and in 2020 he became a professor.

Fellowship and membership 
He is a member of the Scientific Council of the Institute of Electronics, International Association of Engineers and the European Materials Research Society. He is also a Member of Arab-German Academy of Sciences and Humanities, Young The World Academy of Science fellow and a Senior Member of IEEE.

Awards and honours 
He received the Shoman Award for Arab Researchers - Engineering Sciences in 2011,  and the Microsoft-TWAS-AAS Award in 2010.

References 

Algerian scientists
University of Batna alumni
Fellows of the African Academy of Sciences
1975 births
Living people